The 24th congressional district of Ohio was created for the 1966 election, after the banning of at-large seats by the Voting Rights Act of 1965. It replaced Ohio's at-large congressional district. It was eliminated in the redistricting following the 1970 census. At the time of its creation, it consisted of the southwestern counties of Preble, Butler, Warren and parts of southern and eastern Montgomery.

List of members representing the district

Election results
The following chart shows historic election results. Bold name indicates victor. Italic name indicates incumbent.

References

 Congressional Biographical Directory of the United States 1774–present

24
Former congressional districts of the United States
1967 establishments in Ohio
1973 disestablishments in Ohio
Constituencies established in 1967
Constituencies disestablished in 1973